Novy Arslan (Yañı Arıślan) is a rural locality (a village) in Bishkurayevsky Selsoviet, Tuymazinsky District, Bashkortostan, Russia. The population was 19 as of 2010. There is 1 street.

Geography 
Novy Arslan is located 55 km east of Tuymazy (the district's administrative centre) by road. Yulduzly is the nearest rural locality.

References 

Rural localities in Tuymazinsky District